Debbie Brennan is a Paralympian athlete from Great Britain competing mainly in category T34 sprint events.

At the 2000 Sydney Paralympics, Brennan won gold in the women's 200m T34 and bronze in the women's 100m T34.

Brennan competed in the 100m and 200m in the T34 class at the 2004 Summer Paralympics in Athens and won a silver and bronze medal respectively.

Brennan is from Telford in Shropshire where she grew up and could often be seen out with her dad training in her wheelchair as he delivered and collected the football pools.

References

External links
 profile on paralympic.org

Paralympic athletes of Great Britain
Athletes (track and field) at the 2000 Summer Paralympics
Athletes (track and field) at the 2004 Summer Paralympics
Paralympic gold medalists for Great Britain
Paralympic silver medalists for Great Britain
Paralympic bronze medalists for Great Britain
British female sprinters
Living people
Medalists at the 2000 Summer Paralympics
Medalists at the 2004 Summer Paralympics
Year of birth missing (living people)
Paralympic medalists in athletics (track and field)